Darío Ramón Vivas Velasco (12 June 1950 – 13 August 2020) was a Venezuelan politician, member of the 2017 National Constituent Assembly and the Governor of the Capital District. Vivas formerly served as National Assembly deputy representing the Capital District for two consecutive periods. He also served as its first vice president twice (2010–2011) and (2013–2015) and as vice president of the Inter-Parliamentary Union Conference in 2015.

Political career 
He was Director of Tours and Events for the Fifth Republic Movement (MVR) until 2006, when the party was renamed to the United Socialist Party of Venezuela (PSUV), where Vivas held the same position of Director of tours and events.

He was a deputy to the National Assembly of Venezuela for two consecutive periods from 2010 to mid-2017, separating from his position to run for the next election. On 30 July 2017, he was elected as a member of the National Constituent Assembly.

Death
During the COVID-19 pandemic in Venezuela, Vivas announced that he had tested positive for COVID-19 on 19 July 2020. He died from the virus on 13 August 2020, at the age of 70.

Laws 
The laws promoted by Darío Vivas as Deputy to the National Assembly have included: 
Reform of the Electoral Processes (2009)
Community Council Law Reform (2009)
Creation of the Two Level Municipal Regime of the Metropolitan Area (2009)
Special Law of the Capital District Regime (2009)
Capital District Budget Law (2009)
Law on Protection of Mortgage Debtors (2007)

Sanctions

United States 
On 9 August 2017, the United States Department of the Treasury placed sanctions on Vivas for his position in the 2017 Constituent Assembly of Venezuela.

Panama 
On 29 March 2018, Vivas was sanctioned by the Panamanian government for his alleged involvement with "money laundering, financing of terrorism and financing the proliferation of weapons of mass destruction."

Canada 
Responding to the May 2018 presidential election, Canada sanctioned 14 Venezuelans, including Vivas, stating that the "economic, political and humanitarian crisis in Venezuela has continued to worsen as it moves ever closer to full dictatorship". The government said the 2018 presidential election was "illegitimate and anti-democratic," and sanctioned Vivas, along with 13 other members of the Constituent Assembly and Supreme Court.

References 

1950 births
2020 deaths
Members of the National Assembly (Venezuela)
United Socialist Party of Venezuela politicians
Fifth Republic Movement politicians
People from Vargas (state)
People of the Crisis in Venezuela
Deaths from the COVID-19 pandemic in Venezuela
Death in Caracas
Members of the Venezuelan Constituent Assembly of 2017